Starstruck is a 1982 Australian comedy-drama musical film directed by Gillian Armstrong and starring Jo Kennedy, Ross O'Donovan and Margo Lee. The plot concerns two teenagers trying to break into the music industry. The film was shot on location in Sydney, New South Wales, Australia. It was marketed with the tagline "A Comedy Musical." The hotel shots were filmed at the Harbour View Hotel in The Rocks, near the south pylon of the Sydney Harbour Bridge.

Plot
Sydney teenager Jackie Mullens works as a barmaid in her mother's failing pub, but dreams of becoming a singing star. Her scheming 14-year-old cousin Angus aspires to be her manager. At a local club talent night, Jackie's performance impresses pop band The Wombats, who become her backing band. Jackie also begins dating the band's guitarist, Robbie.

In an attempt to get Jackie on a TV talent show, "The Wow! Show", Angus calls up the show's host, Terry Lambert, and tells him Jackie will be walking a tightrope between high-rise buildings, nude. Although the stunt backfires, Terry is intrigued enough to feature Jackie on the show. Jackie develops a crush on the suave Terry, and under his influence, she drops the Wombats from her act, tones down her quirky style of music and dress to be more conventional, and breaks up with Robbie who disapproves of these changes. Jackie's TV appearance with her new look and sound is a failure, and afterwards she discovers that Terry, who she thought was romantically interested in her, is actually gay. Humiliated, she reconciles with Robbie. Meanwhile, Angus' deadbeat father Lou has returned and begun romancing Jackie's hardworking mother Pearl, but the affair ends badly when Lou disappears with all the money from the pub's safe, leaving Pearl and the pub, which was already on the verge of closing, in dire financial straits.

In order to save both the pub and Jackie's singing career, Angus comes up with a plan for Jackie and the Wombats to crash The Wow! Show's New Year's Eve talent competition at the Sydney Opera House by posing as stage crew and then taking over the stage.  The plan works and Jackie wins the $25,000 prize, thus becoming a star and saving the pub.

Cast

The film marks Geoffrey Rush's first (albeit brief) appearance in a feature film, as the floor manager of a live-to-air television pop music program.

Production 
The screenplay was written by journalist Stephen MacLean, who had grown up in a Melbourne pub where his mother used to work; he also worked as a child actor. He pitched the idea of making an Australian musical to David Elfick who commissioned a script. The first choice for director was Graeme Clifford who pulled out to make Frances (1982). Gillian Armstrong became involved, attracted by the idea of making a film so different from her first, My Brilliant Career.

The budget was originally $250,000 but Elfick says it went over by a couple of hundred thousand dollars.

Lead actors Jo Kennedy and Ross O'Donovan were cast despite their limited experience because of their chemistry during auditions.

Production designer Brian Thomson is best known for his work on The Rocky Horror Picture Show and its theatre production as well as its follow-up feature film Shock Treatment.

Music
The film spawned a soundtrack album, which includes the hit single "Body and Soul" sung by Jo Kennedy. The song was written by Tim Finn of Split Enz and had originally appeared as 'She Got Body She Got Soul' on the band's 1979 album Frenzy. Jo Kennedy's version reached number 5 on the Australian charts in May 1982.

The film also featured music by The Swingers (whose leader Phil Judd had previously been a member of Split Enz) and who perform on screen at key moments. The other members were Wayne Stevens (aka Bones Hillman, credited as Dwayne Hillman), and Ian Gilroy.

The closing credits include the name Phil Judd as sound recordist. It is not clear whether this refers to the musician or to Phil Judd, an audio engineer who specializes in movie soundtracks.

Charts

Reception

Box office
The film was classified NRC (Not Recommended for Children) which limited promotion options. Clips from the film were forbidden to be shown on the TV show Countdown despite the fact that clips from Hollywood NRC-rated films screened on the show.

Starstruck grossed $1,541,000 at the box office in Australia, which is equivalent to $4,484,310 in 2009 dollars, which is equivalent to $5,613,523.05 in 2020 dollars.

Awards
Starstruck received three AFI Award nominations, for Best Achievement in Costume Design, Best Achievement in Production Design and Best Original Music Score.

Home media
The film was released on VHS and on DVD in 2005, but has long been out of print in Australia.

In 2015 the Australian National Film and Sound Archive produced a new digital transfer of an original 35mm print, which may have been released by Umbrella Entertainment but by 2022 was out of print.

A 2-disc DVD with DTS soundtrack is available in the US from Blue Underground.

See also
 Sydney in film
 List of Australian films
 Cinema of Australia

References

Further reading
 Murray, Scott (editor), Australian Film, 1978-1994, Oxford, 1995.

External links
 Starstuck fan site
 
 
 Starstruck at Oz Movies
 
Starstruck at the National Film and Sound Archive

1982 films
1980s musical comedy-drama films
Australian musical comedy-drama films
1982 independent films
Films set in Sydney
Films shot in Sydney
Australian independent films
Films directed by Gillian Armstrong
1982 comedy films
1982 drama films
1980s English-language films